The McLaren M14A is a Formula One racing car built and raced by McLaren in the 1970 World Championship and the 1971 World Championship. A later extension, the McLaren M14D featured a V8 Alfa Romeo engine.

Design

M14A
The M14A was an evolution of the previous M7A and M7C, with the primary change being the rear brakes were mounted inboard instead of outboard. As with the M7, the M14A was powered by a Cosworth DFV V8 and a Hewland 5-speed manual gearbox.

M14D
Like the M7D, the M14D was commissioned by Alfa Romeo's Autodelta competition department. It was a standard M14A powered by the 3.0 litre V8 engine from Alfa Romeo's T33 sports car.

Competition history

1970
The Formula 1 season started out with two second places, a fourth, and three retirements for Bruce McLaren and Denny Hulme. Bruce McLaren was killed on 2 June 1970 at the Goodwood Circuit while testing the new M8D Can-Am car. McLaren withdrew their entries to the Belgian Grand Prix, which was run five days after the fatal accident. Hulme had also been injured the month before in a methanol fire while practicing for the Indianapolis 500.

McLaren resumed racing at the Dutch Grand Prix, with Dan Gurney and Peter Gethin driving. Hulme came back for the next race in France, replacing Gethin. Gurney ran one more race, then was replaced by Gethin for the rest of the season. Hulme was able to score three third places, but McLaren finished fifth in the 1970 Constructor's Championship.

Andrea de Adamich began the season campaigning an Alfa Romeo powered M7D, then switched to the M14D, also Alfa Romeo powered, for the Dutch Grand Prix.

1971
Peter Gethin started the 1971 season driving a 14A, while Denny Hulme raced the only 19A that had been built at that point. Following two retirements and an eighth place at the Spanish Grand Prix, Gethin was also given a 19A to race. The 14A was brought out of retirement for Jackie Oliver to race, who finished with a retirement, a ninth, and a seventh place to cap off the career of the McLaren 14A.

Complete Formula One World Championship results
(key) (results in bold indicate pole position; results in italics indicate fastest lap)

* All points in  scored using the McLaren M19A

References

McLaren M14
1970 Formula One season cars
1971 Formula One season cars